Louisiana Highway 15 (LA 15) is a state highway located in central and northern Louisiana.  It runs  in a north–south direction from the junction of LA 1 and LA 970 in Lettsworth to the concurrent U.S. Highways 63 and 167 in Lillie.  The middle portion of the route, extending  from Ferriday to just north of Mangham, is co-signed with US 425 and is a major four-lane highway through the area.

Route description
LA 15 begins at a junction with LA 1 in Pointe Coupee Parish.  The highway heads north and crosses several bridges spanning various channels of the Old River Control Structure.  LA 15 parallels the Mississippi River through a remote rural section of Concordia Parish before reaching junctions with US 84 and US 425 in Ferriday.

Beginning in Ferriday, LA 15 is co-signed with US 425 and becomes a major four-lane through route.  The highway passes through the communities of Clayton, Sicily Island, Wisner, and Gilbert before entering the city of Winnsboro.  Here, US 425 and LA 15 make connections with LA 4 and LA 17.

Continuing northward, the highway travels through Baskin and Mangham.  Just beyond Mangham, at a point known as Archibald, LA 15 turns northwest off of US 425 and proceeds into Monroe, one of northern Louisiana's two metropolitan areas.  The route crosses mainline US 165 on the way into town then overlaps US 165 Bus. into the downtown area.  During this stretch, LA 15 has a diamond interchange with I-20 and passes the Monroe Civic Center.

In Downtown Monroe, LA 15 turns west and runs concurrent with US 80 across the Ouachita River and into the neighboring city of West Monroe.  Just beyond the Lea Joyner Bridge, US 80 and LA 15 intersect LA 34 then zigzag through town, intersecting several major thoroughfares that provide access to the parallel I-20.  West of the city limits, LA 15 turns off of US 80 and heads northwest to Farmerville, situated on Lake D'Arbonne.

LA 15 overlaps both LA 33 and LA 2 in Farmerville.  The route continues through rural Union Parish until reaching its terminus at US 63/US 167 at Lillie, just west of Spearsville.

History
Much of the present route of LA 15 originated as State Route 15 prior to the 1955 Louisiana Highway renumbering.  It was one of the few state highways whose number was carried over into the new system.  Differences from the modern route include bypassed portions such as Old Highway 15, Louisiana Highway 3210, and various country roads.  The highway south of Vidalia and into Pointe Coupee Parish was not part of LA 15 until the 1960s, after the renumbering. There is also a section of the Great River Road in Plaquemines Parish that is called Highway 15.

Major intersections

Gallery

References

External links

 LADOTD map of Numbered Highways in Louisiana
 Louisiana State Highway Log

0015
Transportation in Pointe Coupee Parish, Louisiana
Transportation in West Feliciana Parish, Louisiana
Transportation in Concordia Parish, Louisiana
Transportation in Catahoula Parish, Louisiana
Transportation in Franklin Parish, Louisiana
Transportation in Richland Parish, Louisiana
Transportation in Ouachita Parish, Louisiana
Transportation in Union Parish, Louisiana
015